Arg of Tabriz (also known as Arg Alishah, Arg-e Alishah, Arch of Alishah, Arg Citadel, and Masjid Ali-Shāh), is the remnants of a large acropolis fortification (whence the metathetic name  or  plus ) and city wall in downtown Tabriz, Iran. Its structure is visible from far distances in downtown Tabriz, if not blocked by the newly erected highrise buildings.

The structure was initially a compound, containing a great vaulted mosque, adjoining prayer halls and libraries, a vast courtyard containing a huge reflecting pool, and a mausoleum—all surrounded by a containing wall.  It was built in 14th century during the Ilkhanate era. The point of pride for the building was that its vaulted ayvan was larger than the famous historic vault of Khosrows/Kisra or the Taq Kisra at Ctesiphon/Mada'in. However, with the sudden death of the governor of the city and with some construction complications in constructing a roofed building without pillar for such a huge complex, the mausoleum structure remained incomplete. In the 19th century with the rise of tensions between Iran and Russia the structure rapidly turned into the city's fort and additional military installations such as a barracks and cannon foundry were added to the original structure. During the twentieth century the military installations were removed from original construction and the surrounding of the ark turned into a park. In the late twentieth century a big mosque was built next to the citadel.

History
The original construction was made between 1318 and 1339, during the Ilkhanate. During the construction, the main barrel vault collapsed and the construction was stopped afterward. An earthquake in 1641 severely damaged and collapsed the monument. Centuries later, between the eruption of the Russo-Persian War, 1804-1813, and the Russo-Persian War (1826-1828), the compound was quickly reconstructed as a military compound. During the reconstruction of the Arg compound, a foundry factory for the manufacturing of cannons for the Iranian Army was built as well as a military headquarters, a barrack for the troops, and a small palace. Samson Makintsev (better known as Samson Khan) a Qajar Iranian general of Russian origin, lived inside the citadel for years together with his wife, the daughter of Prince Aleksandre of Georgia.

Shelling of Arg by Russian troops, 1911
During the Russian invasion of Tabriz in 1911, the Russians shelled the Arg in initial attacks. Once they captured the city, they used the Arg as a central command center. During their occupation, because of careless handling, the artillery pieces they used set fire to parts of Arg.

Destruction During Pahlavi era
During the Pahlavi era, parts of the Arg which was presume to have been constructed in the 19th century during the Qajar dynasty were destroyed. In the process, much of the old Ilkhanid and Safavid remnants were also unwittingly destroyed, leaving behind only a tiny section of the back wall containing the Mihrab intact.  This destruction was with the aim of leaving behind only the original Arg construction, ridding it of its later additions and constructions. Much of the original building was last in the process. The southern part of the Arg was turned into a park, the "Mellat Garden" (lit. park of the people), before the Iranian revolution in 1979.

Destruction by revolutionaries, early 1980s
In the early 1980s after the suppression of uprising of supporters of Muslim People's Republic Party against the new establishment of mixing religion and state and neglecting of Azerbaijani minorities, Moslem Malakuti selected Juma of Tabriz as the new Imam. During his tenure in Tabriz, Juma began the destruction of Ark's Qajar era addendum wall, cultural institutes and ark theater and replaced them with a new mosque for Friday prayers. Some people believe this destruction of local heritage was a systematic destruction of local Azerbaijani identity.

Recent renovation, 1990s-present
In the 1990s and 2000s, a rehabilitation and renovation project was executed by the Iranian Organization for Cultural Heritages. During this rehabilitation, however, all of the remaining Qajar era development from Arg citadel were destroyed. At the same period, a new big mosque was built next to the Arg citadel. The superstructure of the new mosque undermine the architecture of Arg citadel. Despite the regulations of the Iranian Organization for Cultural Heritages and several court hearing the construction of the new structure was completed.

Further recent destructions
This action completely destroyed the ancient foundations of the original Arg that still existed underground and were going to be used for a reconstruction attempt at the end of the Pahlavi era. Thus, the new Islamic regime eliminated any chance of methodical reconstruction by wiping out the remaining foundations of the Arg. Ironically, this was done in order to build a new mosque, which could have been built a few dozens of yards farther away from this primary Iranian Islamic archaeological site and spare its destruction. Meanwhile, the main prayer hall of the ancient mosque was turned into a car parking lot, in direct violation of the edict of the Koran which considered a mosque's ground to be sacred and inviolable as long as the traces of it remain. It is visually clear that the new car park is created on nothing but the remains of the main prayer hall of the 700 year old grand mosque.

See also
 List of Iranian castles
 Iranian architecture

References

Sources

Further reading
 

Buildings and structures completed in the 13th century
Castles in Iran
Mosques in Tabriz
Architecture in Iran
13th-century mosques
Tourist attractions in Tabriz
National works of Iran